A lightning round is a round of a game or contest in which the duration of the round is a pre-determined length of time, and the goal is typically to accomplish as much as possible within that period. The most common format of a lightning round is in a question-and-answer game, to answer as many questions as possible within a given time limit. The term "lightning round" is usually reserved for a single round in a game whose normal gameplay is untimed. Lightning rounds are often used at quiz bowls.

In television, a lightning round is usually accompanied by an indicator of the time remaining, and is commonly presented with some increase of intensity, such as a change of lighting, or sound effect (such as a ticking clock), or musical cue. The game show Password, while not the first to employ such a round, was the first to formally call it the "Lightning Round".

The term was also famously used in the Friends episode "The One With the Embryos".

References

Gaming